Eciton mexicanum is a species of New World army ant in the genus Eciton.  Present from Mexico to throughout Costa Rica and northern Argentina, it is found in dry and wet forests in sea level to montane areas.  Raids always occur in columns, tending to be usually nocturnal but are sometimes also encountered during the day. It is closely related to the Eciton burchellii species.

References

External links
 
 New World Army Ants - Eciton mexicanum

Dorylinae
Hymenoptera of South America
Insects described in 1863
Hymenoptera of North America